Campbell Wilson is the chief executive officer and managing director of Air India, from 16 June 2022. He was previously the chief executive officer of Singaporean low-cost airline, Scoot. He was appointed the founding member of the airline on 18 July 2011. Before his appointment, he worked for the SIA group for more than 15 years in countries like Japan, Canada, and Hong Kong. He left Scoot in June 2016 when he was appointed as the acting senior vice president of sales and marketing for Singapore Airlines. He was once again brought back as Scoot CEO on 1 April 2020. On 12 May 2022, he was appointed as the CEO & MD of Air India and was scheduled to leave his role at Scoot on 15 June 2022.

Singapore Airlines
Wilson joined Singapore Airlines in Auckland in 1996 and was appointed vice-president of the airline's operation in Canada in 2006. Two years later, he was appointed general manager of Hong Kong, and then of Japan operations in 2010.

In June 2016, Wilson left Scoot. He was the senior vice president of sales and marketing for Singapore Airlines until returning to Scoot in 2020.

Scoot
Wilson joined Scoot in 2011 and was quoted as saying "my immediate task is to establish a strong management team and we will be actively recruiting to fill senior positions." On 1 November 2011, Campbell officially unveiled the new airline.

Wilson left Scoot in June 2016. Later he returned as the CEO of Scoot in April 2020.

Air India
Wilson assumed the post of CEO & Managing Director of Air India on 15 June 2022. During his tenure, Tata Group was involved in the talks to merge Air India with Vistara, owned by Singapore Airlines, his previous employer.

References

External links
 Scoot Official Website

1971 births
Living people
Chief executives in the airline industry
New Zealand chief executives
Singaporean chief executives